Billy Zeoli was an American evangelical leader, speaker and media executive from Grand Rapids, Michigan. Zeoli served as the White house chaplain to U.S. President Gerald R. Ford and Betty Ford during the mid-1970s offering counsel on national spiritual matters, and acting as spiritual counselor to President Ford. In the 1960s, Zeoli was an early organizer of what would become Baseball Chapel, a Christian organization that provides professional Baseball players, and other athletes, Sunday church services in their locker rooms before sporting events. Zeoli was perhaps most remembered as the long-standing president of Gospel Films Inc, later becoming Gospel Communications Inc, a leading Christian media company that distributed media and promoted ministry outreach around the world. Zeoli held the position from 1962 until he retired from the organization in 2006.

White House Chaplain 
Gerald Ford was elected the Congressional representative of the 5th District of Michigan from 1949 to the time of his Presidency.  Zeoli lived in Grand Rapids, MI and was introduced to Ford by a friend. The two men became friends and Zeoli started sending Ford a devotional once every month in the early 1970s (these devotionals would later become a book called "God's Got a Better Idea", a twist on the Ford political slogan, "Ford has a better idea"). Ford and Zeoli would meet in Washington and frequent events such as the Presidential Prayer Breakfast, and at sporting events where Zeoli was preaching. It was in Washington D.C. at a pre-game chapel service for the Washington Redskins football team that Zeoli convinced then representative Gerald R. Ford to become a Christian.  Ford would later become Vice-President of the United States when Spiro Agnew resigned on October 10, 1973.  While Zeoli was vacationing in Oberammergau, Germany, Ford called Zeoli and informed him that Richard Nixon had resigned and that Ford was now the 38th President of the United States. For the remainder of Ford's Presidency, Zeoli would visit the White House and counsel on spiritual matters with the President. Zeoli's book "God's Got a Better Idea" described the many issues that the two discussed including; clemency for draft evaders, the U. S. withdrawal from Vietnam, the Mayaguez incident, and the difficult question of issuing a pardon to former U.S. President Richard Nixon, who had resigned following the Watergate scandal and the administration's attempted cover-up of its involvement.

Sports Ministry and Media 
Zeoli was well-known as a preacher to professional sports teams and celebrities. He was one of the early advocates of the practice of preaching to professional athletes that were working on Sunday. The subject was controversial at the time in Zeoli's community of West Michigan, where he took criticism from many in the Christian Reformed church community. Working with Baseball Chapel founder Watson Spoelstra, and New York Yankee great Bobby Richardson, Zeoli helped to increase the frequency of these services in baseball, football and other sports. Zeoli was the minister for several Super Bowls, World Series, and All-Star Games services and received recognition as a minister for several American major league professional sport teams and athletes.

Gospel Films and Gospel Communications 
Zeoli was working as the director for Indianapolis Youth For Christ when he was hired to lead a fledgling Christian film company in Muskegon, MI called Gospel Films. Under his 44-year tenure, Zeoli would come to be known as an innovator in para-church ministry. He appealed to the youth movement and was a devote of McLuhan, utilizing the media of the era to reach into new territory. He created a free film program for American schools, prisons and the military, while leveraging the power of media for evangelizing the globe though the use of indigenous clergy. Gospel Films and Zeoli were the executive producers of How Should We Then Live: The Rise and Decline of Western Thought and Culture. The 1977 documentary film series was hosted by the American philosopher and missionary theologian Francis Schaeffer of L'Abri fame. The American distribution of the film, an accompanying book, and subsequent film tour in the United States by the Schaeffers' was responsible for bringing many evangelical Protestants into the then largely Roman Catholic public protest movement against the United States Supreme Court Roe v. Wade decision,  that supported legal abortion in the United States. Francis Schaeffer's son, Frank Schaeffer, with the help of wealthy American evangelical donors (such as Amway co-founder Richard DeVos) would go on to make a successful follow-up, entitled Whatever Happened to the Human Race.

Over the decades, Zeoli would helm the many technological transitions in media format, from film to video to DVD and in 1995, launched GospelCom, an innovative Christian website and partnership and hosting portal, where ministries could work together to reach out to their constituencies. In 1998, Gospel Films became Gospel Communications International Inc.  Gospel Communications International developed the BibleGateway.com web site and also trained and hosted hundreds of evangelical ministries on the World Wide Web beginning in 1995. By the mid 2000s, Zeoli stepped away from day-to-day operations of Gospel Communications and eventually, the 2008 financial crisis contributed to the shuttering of the organization.

References

People from Muskegon, Michigan
Presidency of Gerald Ford
Living people
Michigan Republicans
1932 births